Turdakun Usubalievich Usubaliev (6 November 1919 – 7 September 2015) was a Soviet Union-era Kyrgyz politician and First Secretary of the Central Committee of the Communist Party of Kyrgyzstan in the period 1961–1985.

He was born in a peasant family in Kochkor. In 1941, he graduated from the Kyrgyz National Institute, and in 1965 the Moscow State Pedagogical University in absentia. In 1941, he was an activist of the Communist Party from 1941 to 1945, and a deputy head of department in the district committee, and the instructor of the Central Committee of KP Kyrgyzstan. From 1945 to 1955, he was the instructor of the Central Committee of the CPSU, and from 1955 to 1956 editor of the newspaper of the Kyrgyz SSR. From 1956 to 1958, he was the head of one of the departments of the Central Committee of the Communist Party of Kyrgyzstan, and from 1958 to 1961, he was the First Secretary of the Frunze City Committee of the Communist Party of Kirghizia. Then, from 9 May 1961 until his retirement on 2 November 1985, he was the First Secretary of the Central Committee of the Communist Party of Kyrgyzstan. In June 2008 he was a co-founder of the political movement "The Great Kyrgyzstan".

Usubalijev died in Bishkek in September 2015 at the age of 95.

References

1919 births
2015 deaths
Soviet politicians
Heroes of the Kyrgyz Republic
People from Naryn Region
First secretaries of the Communist Party of Kirghizia
Moscow State Pedagogical University alumni
Central Committee of the Communist Party of the Soviet Union members
Sixth convocation members of the Supreme Soviet of the Soviet Union
Seventh convocation members of the Supreme Soviet of the Soviet Union
Eighth convocation members of the Supreme Soviet of the Soviet Union
Ninth convocation members of the Supreme Soviet of the Soviet Union
Tenth convocation members of the Supreme Soviet of the Soviet Union
Eleventh convocation members of the Supreme Soviet of the Soviet Union